J. S. Dorton Arena is a 7,610-seat multi-purpose arena located in Raleigh, North Carolina, on the grounds of the North Carolina State Fair. It opened in 1952.

Architect Maciej Nowicki of the North Carolina State University Department of Architecture was killed in an airplane crash before the construction phase. Local architect William Henley Dietrick supervised the completion of the arena using Nowicki's innovative design. Said design features a steel cable supported saddle-shaped roof in tension, held up by parabolic concrete arches in compression. The arches cross about 20 feet above ground level and continue underground, where the ends of the arches are held together by more steel cables in tension. The outer walls of the arena support next to no weight at all. 

Dorton Arena was listed in the National Register of Historic Places on April 11, 1973. Originally named the "State Fair Arena", it was dedicated to Dr. J. S. Dorton, former North Carolina State Fair manager, in 1961.

In the past, it has hosted many sporting events, concerts, political rallies and circuses.

Historic significance  
The Dorton Arena was the first structure in the world to use a cable-supported roof.  The structure is based on two parabolic concrete arches which lean over to the point that they are closer to being parallel to the ground than they are to being vertical. The arches lean toward and beyond each other such that they cross each other 26 feet above ground.  These arches, approaching horizontal in plane, thus serve as the outer edges of the structure, which when viewed from above appears almost elliptical.  The arches are supported by slender columns around the building perimeter. Cables are strung between the two opposing arch structures providing support for the saddle-shaped roof. This was the first permanent cable-supported roof in the world.  

Completed in 1952, the arena was the predecessor of more famous domed stadiums to follow such as the Houston Astrodome in 1965 and the Louisiana Superdome in 1975. Dorton Arena was designated as a National Historic Civil Engineering Landmark by the American Society of Civil Engineers in 2002.

Sports 
Dorton Arena has hosted numerous sporting events and teams throughout the decades. The longest-running tenant was the Raleigh IceCaps (ECHL) ice hockey team from 1991–1998. The American Basketball Association's Carolina Cougars also played some games in the arena from 1969–74.  It was also the home of the Carolina Rollergirls (WFTDA).

The Cougars became tenants after the Houston Mavericks moved to North Carolina in 1969. The Cougars were a "regional franchise", playing "home" games in Charlotte (Bojangles' Coliseum), Greensboro (Greensboro Coliseum), Winston-Salem Memorial Coliseum and Raleigh (Dorton Arena). Hall of Fame Coach Larry Brown began his coaching career with the Cougars in 1972. Billy Cunningham was the ABA MVP for the Brown and theCougars in the 1972–73 season. Despite a strong fan base the Cougars were sold and moved to St. Louis in 1974.

Dorton Arena was a popular venue for professional wrestling in the 70s and 80s, with sometimes weekly matches. Wrestler Rowdy Roddy Piper defeated “Nature Boy” Ric Flair for the National Wrestling Alliance U.S. Heavyweight championship in Dorton Arena on Jan. 27, 1981.

Beginning in 2016, it became the home of the Triangle Torch in American Indoor Football. The Torch have since played as members of Supreme Indoor Football but left Dorton Arena prior to the 2018 season in the American Arena League.

Other events 
Besides hosting sporting events, the arena is also used for concerts during the North Carolina State Fair. Various conventions and fairs also use floorspace of the arena as an exhibition space, often in conjunction with the neighboring Jim Graham building.

The arena has hosted the FIRST Robotics Competition (FRC) regional robotics competition and was the first space to hold a regional in the state.

Both Shaw University and Meredith College use Dorton Arena as a site for graduation, and the North Carolina School of Science and Mathematics use the facility as a rain site for their commencement exercises.

Concerts  (non-fair) 
Dorton Arena and Reynolds Coliseum were the only concert venues in the Capital City for many decades before Walnut Creek Amphitheater and PNC Arena were built. The building was originally designed for livestock shows, not for concerts, so while there are unobstructed views of the stage, the sound tends to bounce off the glass. Fair officials have made significant changes to improve the acoustics of the building in recent years. Many of the biggest names in entertainment have played in this arena.

See also
Tensile architecture
Tensile and membrane structures
Thin-shell structure
List of thin shell structures
List of Registered Historic Places in North Carolina
List of historic civil engineering landmarks

References

External links

 Official Website  via the NC Department of Agriculture and Consumer Services
 Historic photos of Dorton Arena
 Matthew Nowicki Papers at NCSU Libraries, includes drawings of Dorton
 Video: JS Dorton Arena, the Fairground Pavilion That Was a Modernist Marvel by ArchDaily.com, 4 September 2014

Event venues on the National Register of Historic Places in North Carolina
Sports venues completed in 1952
American Basketball Association venues
Basketball venues in North Carolina
Carolina Cougars
Indoor ice hockey venues in the United States
Indoor arenas in North Carolina
Tensile membrane structures
Buildings and structures in Raleigh, North Carolina
National Register of Historic Places in Raleigh, North Carolina
Sports venues in Raleigh, North Carolina
Historic Civil Engineering Landmarks
Sports venues on the National Register of Historic Places in North Carolina
1952 establishments in North Carolina